A2 Ethniki Women's Volleyball is the 2nd-tier of championship of women's volleyball in Greece. Since current year, the championship is held in four subgroups of teams. The winners of each subgroups take part in play off games. The winners of play off team take part in final four and three best teams promote to A1 Ethniki. In current season the winners are  AOF Porfyras, Iraklis Kifissias and APS Corinthos. From 2017 to 2018 season established a second level in A2 category named as Women's Pre League.

Winners

Recent winners
Two groups

Three groups

Final Four system

Pre League system

Current teams

Pre League
The clubs taking part in the 2017–18 league are:

A2 League
The clubs taking part in the 2017–18 league are:

References

External links
Hellenic Volleyball Federation 
  Greek Pre League.women.volleybox.net 

Volleyball in Greece
Greece women2
Greece
Women's sports leagues in Greece
Professional sports leagues in Greece